Martin Mazáč (born 6 May 1990) is a retired Czech athlete who specialised in the sprint hurdles. He represented his country at the 2010 and 2014 World Indoor Championships, as well as the 2013 World Championships, without advancing from the first round.

His personal bests are 13.48 seconds in the 110 metres hurdles (+0.4 m/s, Tábor 2013) and 7.64 seconds in the 60 metres hurdles (Prague 2014).

International competitions

References

1990 births
Living people
Czech male hurdlers
World Athletics Championships athletes for the Czech Republic
Competitors at the 2011 Summer Universiade
Competitors at the 2013 Summer Universiade